MSTR may refer to:
Missouri University of Science and Technology Nuclear Reactor
Massena Terminal Railroad
McLoughlin Scar Tissue Release®
Abbreviation form of the address 'Master'
MicroStrategy